Bake Off SBT is a Brazilian holiday–themed celebrity reality television competition spin-off from the main series Bake Off Brasil.

The series premiered on Saturday, December 23, 2017 at 9:30 p.m. (BRT / AMT) on SBT, aiming to find the best amateur celebrity baker from SBT.

Host and judges
Key

Series overview

Season 1 (2017)
Fashion consultant Isabella Fiorentino won the competition with Nadja Haddad as the runner-up and Lívia Andrade finishing in third place.

Results summary

Key
  Advanced
  Judges' favourite bakers
  Star Baker
  Eliminated
  Judges' bottom bakers
  Runner-up
  Winner

Season 2 (2018)
TV host Patricia Abravanel won the competition with Carla Fioroni as the runner-up and João Fernandes finishing in third place.

Results summary

Key
  Advanced
  Judges' favourite bakers
  Star Baker
  Eliminated
  Judges' bottom bakers
  Runner-up
  Winner

Season 3 (2019)
Makeup artist Junior Mendes won the competition with Lucas Anderi as the runner-up and Isabella Fiorentino finishing in third place.

It featured six returning contestants: Arlindo Grund, Isabella Fiorentino, Lívia Andrade and Matheus Ceará (from season 1); Otávio Mesquita and Sophia Valverde (from season 2).

Results summary

Key
  Advanced
  Judges' favourite bakers
  Star Baker
  Eliminated
  Judges' bottom bakers
  Runner-up
  Winner

Ratings and reception

Brazilian ratings
All numbers are in points and provided by Kantar Ibope Media.

External links
 Bake Off Brasil on SBT.com.br

References

2017 Brazilian television series debuts
2017 Brazilian television seasons
2017 in Brazilian television
Reality television spin-offs
Brazil
Brazilian television series based on British television series